Sadig Guliyev (born on 9 March 1995) is an Azerbaijani footballer who plays as a defender for Machhindra F.C. in the Martyr's Memorial A-Division League.

Club career
On 28 April 2013, Guliyev made his debut in the Azerbaijan Premier League for Gabala match against Qarabağ.

Guliyev was released by Gabala on 11 June 2021.

On 27 October 2021, Guliyev signed season long deal with Nepalese club Machhindra F.C.

Honours

International
Azerbaijan U23
 Islamic Solidarity Games: 2017

References

External links
 

1995 births
Living people
Association football defenders
Azerbaijani footballers
Azerbaijan youth international footballers
Azerbaijan under-21 international footballers
Azerbaijan Premier League players
Gabala FC players
Zira FK players